G-series trains are the fastest train services of China Railway. The prefix "G" is pronounced as Gao in the CR system, which is short for Gaosu Dongche meaning high-speed EMUs in Chinese. The numbering of G trains are defined by the prefix G followed by a train number. Compared with D-series trains, G-series trains are operated at higher speeds for either part or whole of the journey, and if compared to the D trains sharing  the route, may have fewer stops and even overtake these D trains by giving the latter a longer stay at some stations. G trains are also the only type of train that do not permit standees.

Rolling stocks 

 CRH2C – The first type of high speed train running on ballast-free track. It is developed from CRH2A, which is based on the E2 Series Shinkansen from Japan 
 CRH3C – A version of the Siemens Velaro high-speed train. 

 CRH380 – Includes a series of EMUs: CRH380A and CRH380AL are developed from CRH2C. CRH380B, CRH380BG, CRH380BL and CRH380CL are variants of CRH3C. CRH380D is derived from Bombardier Zefiro. 
CR400 – It is divided into CR400AF and CR400BF. The CR series are typically referred to as the Fuxing class.

References

Passenger rail transport in China